Michael Jackson: Live at the Apollo was a concert by Michael Jackson. The concert was performed at the Apollo Theater in New York City on April 24, 2002. The concert was a fundraiser for the Democratic National Committee and former President Bill Clinton. The money collected would be used to encourage citizens to vote. It raised almost $3 million. Dave Navarro played guitar during the song "Black or White". This was Michael Jackson's final on-stage performance.

Set-list
 "Dangerous"
 "Black or White"
 "Stranger in Moscow" (Instrumental interlude, rehearsal only)
 "We Are The World" (Instrumental interlude) 
 "Heal the World"

Rarity
Jackson's performance at the event has remained unavailable in its entirety. A sole video clip of "Dangerous" was officially published by C-SPAN, acknowledging that copyright issues prohibit any further releases. However, a soundboard recording of the full concert leaked in 2016. Other clips from the rehearsals for "Heal the World" and "Black or White" leaked in subsequent years. The latter features Dave Navarro from Jane's Addiction and Jackson's friend and choreographer, LaVelle Smith Jr.

Date

Preparation date

References

Michael Jackson concerts
2002 in American music
2002 in New York City
2000s in Manhattan
April 2002 events in the United States
Concerts in the United States
Democratic Party (United States) events
Events in New York City
Music of New York City